Greece sent a delegation to compete at the 2010 Winter Paralympics, in Vancouver. It fielded a total of two athletes (one man and one woman), both in alpine skiing.

Alpine skiing 

Two athletes represented Greece in alpine skiing:

Women

Men

See also
Greece at the 2010 Winter Olympics
Greece at the Paralympics

References

External links
Vancouver 2010 Paralympic Games official website
International Paralympic Committee official website

Nations at the 2010 Winter Paralympics
2010
Paralympics